Trachylepis dumasi is a species of skink, a lizard in the family Scincidae. The species is endemic to Madagascar.

Etymology
The specific name, dumasi, is in honor of American herpetologist Philip Conrad Dumas.

Habitat

Description
Dorsally, the head, body, and tail are brown.

Reproduction
The mode of reproduction of T. dumasi is unknown.

References

Further reading
Bauer AM (2003). "On the identity of Lacerta punctata Linnaeus 1758, the type species of the genus Euprepis Wagler 1830, and the generic assignment of Afro-Malagasy skinks". African Journal of Herpetology 52 (1): 1–7. (Trachylepis dumasi, new combination).
Glaw F, Vences M (2006). A Field Guide to the Amphibians and Reptiles of Madagascar, Third Edition. Cologne, Germany. Vences & Glaw Verlag. 496 pp. .
Mausfeld P, Schmitz A (2003). "Molecular phylogeography, intraspecific variation and speciation of the Asian scincid lizard genus Eutropis Fitzinger, 1843 (Squamata: Reptilia: Scincidae): taxonomic and biogeographic implications". Organisms Diversity & Evolution 3: 161–171. (Eutropis dumasi, new combination).
Nussbaum RA, Raxworthy CJ (1995). "A new Mabuya (Reptilia: Squamata: Scincidae) of the aureopunctata-group from southern Madagascar". Journal of Herpetology 29 (1): 28–38. (Mabuya dumasi, new species).

Trachylepis
Reptiles described in 1995
Taxa named by Ronald Archie Nussbaum
Taxa named by Christopher John Raxworthy